Hati District (also Romanized as Hatti) is a district (bakhsh) in Lali County, Khuzestan Province, Iran. At the 2006 census, its population was 8,393, in 1,496 families.  The district has no cities. The district has two rural districts (dehestan): Hati Rural District and Jastun Shah Rural District.

References 

Lali County
Districts of Khuzestan Province